The original historic Knights Templar were a Christian military order, the Order of the Poor Fellow Soldiers of Christ and of the Temple of Solomon, that existed from the 12th to 14th centuries to provide warriors in the Crusades. These men were famous in the high and late Middle Ages, but the Order was disbanded very suddenly by King Philip IV of France, who took action against the Templars in order to avoid repaying his own financial debts. He accused them of heresy, ordered the arrest of all Templars within his realm, put the Order under trial and many of them burned at the stake. The dramatic and rapid end of the Order led to many stories and legends developing about them over the following centuries. The Order and its members increasingly appear in modern fiction, though most of these references portray the medieval organization inaccurately.

In modern works, the Templars generally are portrayed as villains, misguided zealots, representatives of an evil secret society, or as the keepers of a long-lost treasure. Several modern organizations also claim heritage from the medieval Templars, as a way of enhancing their own image or mystique.

Modern organizations

Temperance movement

Many temperance organizations named themselves after the Poor Fellow-Soldiers of Christ and of the Temple of Solomon, citing the belief that the original Knights Templar "drank sour milk, and also because they were fighting 'a great crusade' against 'this terrible vice' of alcohol." The largest of these, the International Order of Good Templars (IOGT), grew throughout the world after being started in the 19th century and continues to advocate for the abstinence of alcohol and other drugs. Other Orders in this tradition include those of the Templars of Honor and Temperance (Tempel Riddare Orden), which has a large presence in Scandinavia.

Freemasonry

Freemasonry has contained references to the Knights Templar since at least the 18th century; Templar symbols and rituals are incorporated in a number of Masonic bodies.

The best-known reference to the Knights Templar in Freemasonry is the Degree of Knight of the Temple, or "Order of the Temple", the final order joined in "The United Religious, Military and Masonic Orders of the Temple and of St John of Jerusalem, Palestine, Rhodes and Malta" commonly known as the Knights Templar. Freemasonry is traditionally open to men of all faiths, asking only that they have a belief in a supreme being, but membership in this Masonic body (and others) is open only to Freemasons who profess a belief in the Christian religion. These Knights Templar often take part in public parades and exhibitions, wearing distinctive uniforms and have had a number of high-profile members such as Henry Ford, and Harry S. Truman.

In the later 20th century, masonic Knights Templar became the subject of pseudohistorical theories connecting them to the medieval order, even though such a connection is rejected by Masonic authorities themselves and the source known to historians.

Self-styled orders

The Order of the Solar Temple is one infamous example of a "neo-Templar" group, founded in 1984, that claimed descent from the original Knights Templar; there are several other self-styled orders that also claim to be descended from, or revivals of, the Templar Order. Another Templar-related order, the Sovereign Military Order of the Temple of Jerusalem, is a charitable organization founded in 1804 which has achieved United Nations NGO special status. They are a part of the larger Ordo Supremus Militaris Templi Hierosolymitani (OSMTH), commonly called Knights Templar Worldwide. Some members of the OSMTH claim to be the direct descendants of the original Knights Templar, citing the Larmenius Charter as proof; however, this document is suspected to be a forgery.

In May 2018 BBC News reported that since 2015 far-right activist Jim Dowson has been fronting a UK-based anti-immigrant organization, 'Knights Templar International', with Dowson's sister-in-law Marion Thomas named as one of its directors. In April 2019, Knights Templar International and Jim Dowson were banned by Facebook for spreading hate.

Scholarly reception
The popularity of the Knights Templar in modern fiction and their presence in pseudohistorical or fringe literature has received scholarly attention.

At the 2005 Annual Conference of the American Culture Association, their call for papers was specifically about such conspiracy theories relating to the Templars and their association with other legends and mysterious organizations. Literary theorists puzzle over Umberto Eco's use in his novel Foucault's Pendulum of the Templars as a symbol of postmodernist rewriting of history. Historian Malcolm Barber writes that "Mystic Templars are omnipresent in all good conspiracy theories." On Day to Day, a program on American NPR, host Alex Chadwick discussed "the literary fascination with the Knights Templar." In Poland, the Toruń Museum had an exhibition entitled "The Knights Templar – History and Myth" which offered a description, "Apart from pieces of "high art", the exhibit will grant equal importance to "popular culture" items (literature, film, Internet content) exploring the subject of the Knights Templar." In 2007, a National Post editorial noted that "the Templars remain a living presence in popular culture. This has happened precisely because the historical record concerning their sudden annihilation in the early-14th century at the hands of Philip IV ("the Fair") of France has been so sparse and ambiguous. Time and revolution have damaged and dispersed the sources, and made the Templars a magnet for speculation and imagination."

Popular themes
Popular themes are their supposed association with the Holy Grail and the Ark of the Covenant, and the supposed historical connection to the Freemasons.

The historical Templars had their first headquarters on the Temple Mount, which had been assigned to them by King Baldwin II of Jerusalem. They were in operation there for 75 years. Pseudo-historical books such as The Holy Blood and the Holy Grail theorise that the Templars could have discovered documents hidden in the ruins of the Temple, possibly "proving" that Jesus survived the Crucifixion or possibly "proving" Jesus was married to Mary Magdalene and had children by her. Indeed, the supposition that the Templars must have found something under the Temple Mount lies at the heart of most Templar legends and pseudo-historical theories, also popularised by French author Louis Charpentier (1966). There is no physical or documentary evidence, however, to support such a supposition. It is true that they are documented as having carried a piece of the True Cross into some battles, but this was probably a portion of a timber that was discovered during the 4th century by Saint Helena, the mother of the Emperor Constantine.

Relics and treasure
There are various legends concerning a treasure that some Templars managed to hide from King Philip and that was later lost.
One particular story concerns Rennes-le-Château, where a treasure was supposedly found in the 19th century; one speculative source for that treasure was the long-lost treasure of the Templars.

In a 1910 publication by one Joaquín Miret y Sans, the case is made that the Knights Templar hid and buried the great treasure in Vrana, Zadar County, because Ramón from Serò near Granja del Pairs in Noguera (comarca) in Catalonia  gave a generous gift to the Knights Templar into the hands of their Grand Master Arnold of Torroja. This Ramón was the son of Romana the daughter of Benesmiro de Siponto who was the justitiarius of Monte Sant'Angelo and who was sent by Pope Alexander III as a notifier to Šibenik.

Hugh J. Schonfield (1984)  argued that the Knights Templar may have found the Copper Scroll treasure of the Qumran Essenes in the tunnels beneath the Temple Mount. He suggested that this might explain one of the charges of heresy which were later brought against the knights by the Medieval Inquisition.

Holy Grail
The Holy Blood and the Holy Grail (1982) seems to be the source of the story that the Holy Grail was found by the Order and taken to Scotland during the suppression of the order in 1307, where it remains buried beneath Rosslyn Chapel.

A book published in 2006 claims that the Grail was instead taken to northern Spain, and protected by the Knights Templar there.

Ark of the Covenant
Graham Hancock in his The Sign and the Seal (1992) claimed that the Templars discovered secrets of the Masons, builders of Solomon's Temple, Zerubbabel's Temple, and Herod's Temple at the Temple Mount, along with knowledge that the Ark of the Covenant had been moved to Ethiopia before the destruction of the first temple. Hancock claims that allusion to this is made in engravings on the Cathedral at Chartres, the construction of which was greatly influenced by Bernard of Clairvaux, the Order's patron. Further links to both the search by the order for the Ark and to its discovery of ancient secrets of building are supposedly suggested by the existence of the monolithic Church of Saint George in Lalibela, Ethiopia, which stands to this day but whose construction is incorrectly attributed to the Knights Templar.

Shroud of Turin
Another legendary object that is claimed to have some connection with the Templars is the Shroud of Turin. 
The shroud was first publicly displayed in 1357 by the widow of a nobleman known as Geoffrey of Charney, described by some sources as being a member of the family of the grandson of Geoffroi de Charney, who was burned at the stake with De Molay.

In 2009, Barbara Frale, a paleographer in the Vatican Secret Archives, claimed that 
the Shroud of Turin had been kept by the Templars after 1204. Frale also claimed that "the burial certificate of Jesus the Nazarene", imprinted in fragments of Greek, Hebrew and Latin writing, is visible on the shroud.

The so-called Templecombe painting, a painting discovered in 1945 by Mrs Molly Drew in the roof of an outhouse of a cottage in Templecombe, England, has been alleged to be a copy of the image on the Turin Shroud, and therefore evidence of the Turin Shroud being in the possession of the Knights Templar during its "hidden years".
The painting has been on display in St Mary's Church in the village since 1956 (the only Templar-related site to have survived there), and has been carbon-dated to c. 1280. Some people believe that it is a Templar-commissioned image of either Jesus Christ or the severed head of John the Baptist, although it is without a Halo.

De Molay's curse
Malcolm Barber (2006) discusses a supposed curse uttered by the 
last Grand Master of the Templar Order, Jacques de Molay, as he was burned at the stake in 1314. Jacques de Molay supposedly cursed Philip IV of France and Pope Clement V, saying that he would meet them before God before the year was out. Pope Clement died only a month later, King Phillip died later that year in a hunting accident. Further, within a short span of years thereafter each of Phillip's sons died at relatively young ages, resulting in the end of the House of Capet, leading to disputes over succession and The Hundred Years' War as different factions battled for the throne.

Barber traces this story to a verse chronicle attributed to Geoffrey of Paris (La Chronique métrique attribuée à Geffroi de Paris, ed. A. Divèrres, Strasbourg, 1956, pp. 5711–5742). Geoffrey of Paris was "apparently an eye-witness, who describes Molay as showing no sign of fear and, significantly, as telling those present that God would avenge their deaths".

Albert Pike claimed the Knight Kadosh, the 30th degree within the Ancient Accepted and Scottish Rite, commonly known as a 'Vengeance degree', involved the trampling on the Papal tiara and the royal crown, destined to wreak a just vengeance on the high criminals for the murder of de Molay: the figure of Hiram Abiff representing Jacques de Molay, with the three assassins representing Philip IV of France, Pope Clement V and Squin de Florian. Malcolm Barber has cited a Masonic legend, resembling Pike's claims, in Louis Claude Cadet de Gassicourt's Le Tombeau de Jacques Molai (Paris, 1796, first edition).

A series of mid-20th-century novels, Les Rois maudits (The Accursed Kings) by Maurice Druon, which were first published in 1955, expanded on the story of the curse of Jacques de Molay and the French monarchy in the fourteenth century: 

A popular version of the legend attributes to the curse the death of Louis XVI, saying he belonged to the thirteenth generation after Philip IV. The thirteenth generation is in fact that of Louis XIV's children. A frequent recurring legend relates how when Louis XVI was guillotined, an anonymous French Freemason rushed from the crowd, dipped his hand in the king's blood (or grabbed the head and held it, or is just heard in the crowd) and yelled, "Jacques de Molay, thou art avenged!"

Claims of hidden survival

Supposed Continuity in Freemasonry 

Some historians and authors have tried to draw a link from Freemasonry and its many branches to the Templars. Degrees in the Ancient and Accepted Scottish Rite such as the Knight of Saint Andrew, the Knight of Rose-Croix, and the 32nd Degree in Consistory make reference to a "Masonic Knights Templar" connection, but this is usually dismissed as being ceremonial and not historical fact.

John J. Robinson argues for the Templar–Masonic connection in his book Born in Blood: The Lost Secrets of Freemasonry, in which he alleges that some French Templars fled to Scotland after the suppression of the Order, fearing persecution from both Church and state. He claims that they sought refuge with a lodge of Scottish stonemasons within which they began to teach the virtues of chivalry and obedience, using the builder's tools as a metaphor; and they began eventually taking in "speculative masons" (men of other professions) in order to ensure the continuation of the Order. According to Robinson, the Order existed in secret in this form until the formation of the United Grand Lodge of England in 1717. An example of Templar–Masonic transitory symbolism can supposedly be found in Rosslyn Chapel, owned by the first Earls of Rosslyn, a family with well-documented ties to Scottish Freemasonry; however, Rosslyn Chapel itself dates from at least 100 years after the suppression of the Templars.

The case is also made in Michael Baigent’s and Richard Leigh’s book The Temple and the Lodge.

However, historians Mark Oxbrow, Ian Robertson, Karen Ralls and Louise Yeoman have each made it clear that the Sinclair family had no connection with the Medieval Knights Templar. The Sinclairs’ testimony against the Knights at their 1309 trial is not consistent with any alleged support or membership. In "The Templars and the Grail" Karen Ralls states that among some 50 who testified against the Templars were Henry and William Sinclair.

Knights Templar in Scotland

Since the 1980s, there has been a growing body of publications in both popular fiction and pseudohistory which construct a continuity between the historical presence of the Knights Templar in Scotland with the emergence of Masonic Scottish Knights Templar in the early modern period.

The idea of an association with Rosslyn Chapel originates in the 1982 The Holy Blood and the Holy Grail and entered mainstream pop culture with Dan Brown's The Da Vinci Code (2003), reinforced by the subsequent film of the same name (2006).
Numerous books were published after 2003 to cater to the popular interest in supposed connections between Rosslyn Chapel, Freemasonry, the Templars and the Holy Grail generated by Brown's novel.

The tale of a missing Templar fleet is supposedly based on the protocol of the interrogation of Jean de Châlons by the Inquisition. He claimed that he had heard that preceptor of the French Templars, Gérard de Villiers, had been warned of his imminent arrest. De Villiers had escaped with 50 horses and eighteen galleys. De Châlons' son, Hugues de Châlons, escaped with him carrying the wealth of his uncle, Hugues de Pairaud. In Baigent and Leigh's The Temple and the Lodge, the fleet carried the treasure of the Paris preceptory of the Templars.

Scotland became the destination of the fleet over four centuries later, in the claims of George Frederick Johnson, an exiled Jacobite living in Austria. Johnson, however, turned out to be a fraudster who was probably called Johann Samuel Leuchte. After a chequered career based on alchemy and forgery, "Johnson" convinced a masonic lodge in Jena that he possessed the highest secrets of masonry, and having declared the rest of German masonry irregular, brought a surprising amount of lodges under his control. Exposed as a fraud by Karl Gotthelf von Hund in 1764, he was later apprehended by a previous victim, and spent the rest of his life in prison.

Hund's initial attraction to Johnson was spurred by a need to find his own superiors. He had been received into the Order of the Temple by high ranking Jacobites in Paris during 1743, being introduced to Charles Edward Stuart himself. After the failure of the 1745 rebellion, his masters were either in hiding or dead, and had lost interest in maintaining their Templar offshoots, leaving Hund with a depleted ritual book which he had to reconstruct from memory. As Johnson's collection of lodges now looked to him for leadership, the Rite of Strict Observance was born. Again, the foundation myth alleged that Freemasonry was started by Templar refugees under the protection of Robert the Bruce. This time, they had travelled from France through England disguised as stonemasons, and their use of masonic symbols in their allegories paid tribute to this deception.

Under Hund's leadership, the Rite of Strict Observance became the most popular branch of Freemasonry in the German states, with lodges all over Continental Europe. However, Hund's continuing inability to produce, or even contact his "Unknown Superiors" led to increasing dissatisfaction. Six years after his death, a convent meeting in Wilhelmsbad from 1782 to 1783 finally agreed that Freemasonry had no connection to the Templars, and Strict Observance ceased to exist, most lodges being absorbed into the Rectified Scottish Rite. For most of the previous two decades, the most common foundation myth among German masons stated that Freemasonry came from the Knights Templar, protected and allowed to flourish in Scotland.

In 1815, Claude Thory, a respected French scientist and Freemason, claimed that Robert the Bruce had created the Order of St. Andrew for masons who had supported him at Bannockburn, which was later joined to the Order of Heredom, which he founded at Kilwinning. In 1837, a Scottish Freemason, James Burnes, in attempting to revive a Scottish order of "Knights Templar", expanded the masonic link to Bannockburn. He introduced the Knights Templar as the bearers on Freemasonry to Scotland, and had the Templars play a crucial part in the battle. This appears to be the basis of subsequent tales of Templar involvement at Bannockburn. The contemporary Royal Order of Scotland makes use of a similar foundation myth, which is no more intended to be taken as historical fact than any other piece of masonic allegory.

Discoverers of the New World

Holy Blood, Holy Grail (1982) further embellished the "lost fleet" topos discussed above, alleging that the Templars in these ships "fled to the New World by following old Viking routes", i.e., making one of the pre-Columbian voyages to America. 
Since the popularisation of Holy Blood, Holy Grail with the commercial success of Dan Brown's 2003 novel, there have been numerous allusions to this idea in American pop culture.

A supposed Templar treasure in New York City is featured in the movie National Treasure (2004), starring Nicolas Cage.

As early as 2001, historian Helen Nicholson, in a popular history of the Templars, dispels the idea that the Templars could "spare ships to indulge in world exploration".

The Templar Code for Dummies (2007) also points out the historical implausibility of this scenario:"As for having 18 galleys that may have left from La Rochelle, history doesn't back that up...In shipping records from La Rochelle of the period, there is no record that the Templars had 18 galleys, much less that 18 galleys were at La Rochelle. Reports in the years leading up to the arrest seem to imply that the Templars (and the Hospitallers, for that matter) actually had very few large ships – some suggest no more than four – and hired more from merchant shippers when needed" - Source:

September 11 conspiracy theory 
In "The Twin Towers and the Great Masonic Experiment: Has the 'End of Days' Begun?" Richard C. Hoagland applies esoteric numerology in his theory that the terrorist attacks on the World Trade Center on September 11, 2001, were carried out by the Order of Assassins against the Knights Templar. Michael Barkun, Professor Emeritus of Political Science at Syracuse University, summarizes and discusses Hoagland's 9/11 Templar conspiracy theory in A Culture of Conspiracy: Apocalyptic Visions in Contemporary America: "Each World Trade Center Tower had 110 floors, a multiple of 11. One of them was struck by flight 11, which had 11 crew members, and so on. […] The order of the Knights Templar was recognized by the Vatican in the year 1118, whose integers add up to 11. There are 883 years between that date and 2001, and the sum of those numbers, 19, is the same as the number of hijackers. The number 19 allowed Hoagland to introduce the Koranic numerology of Rashad Khalifa, in which it is central. By the time Hoagland finished, the events of September 11 were revealed to be an attack by none other than the Islamic Order of Assassins on the Knights Templar and the Masons!"

Friday the 13th
There is a modern urban legend to the effect that the tradition of viewing Friday the 13th as unlucky originates with the date of the simultaneous arrest of many Templars at the behest of Philip IV of France, on Friday, 13 October 1307.

Notable examples

Some notable works which have featured the Knights Templar, or stand-ins for them, are listed below.

Films
(Chronological)
An early film by Victorin-Hippolyte Jasset, Le Roi Philippe le Bel et les Templiers (1910), dramatizes Philip IV's campaign against the order.
A series of horror films (Tombs of the Blind Dead (1972), Return of the Blind Dead (1973), The Ghost Galleon (1974), and Night of the Seagulls (1975)) by the Spanish director Amando de Ossorio depicts the Knights Templar as resurrected mummies in search of human blood.
The mythos of the Knights Templar (presented as the fictional "Knights of the Cruciform Sword") as keepers and defenders of the Holy Grail is a central plot point in Indiana Jones and the Last Crusade (1989).
Dolph Lundgren plays the role of a modern-day member of the Knights Templar in the movie The Minion (1998).
In the film Revelation (2001), the order tries to clone Jesus Christ for evil purposes.
The Templar Knights are featured in the French film Le Pacte des loups (2001), in which the symbol of the Templar Knights is seen upon the walls of an old Templar stronghold and upon the Beast's armor. The cult seen in the movie is also supposedly a rogue Templar organization, originally sent by the Pope to teach the King of France a lesson.
Arn – The Knight Templar (2007).
Arn – The Kingdom at Road's End (2008).
Ironclad (2011).

Games
(Alphabetical by game title)
Aion: The Tower of Eternity (2008) features a Templar class.
The Assassin's Creed series features the Assassins as the protagonists and Templars as the main antagonists. The series borrows heavily from Templar history and legends, and incorporates elements of Illuminati conspiracy theories into its canon.
Broken Sword: The Shadow of the Templars (1996) was one of the first video games to reference the Knights Templar. Its sequels, Broken Sword: The Sleeping Dragon (2003) and Broken Sword: The Angel of Death (2006), involve the Templars, as well.
Crusader Kings III features the Knights Templar as one of four Catholic Holy Orders formed if the First Crusade for the Kingdom of Jerusalem is won by the Catholics. Once formed, they are available for hire by any Catholic ruler to fight against rebel uprisings, and wars with members of an opposing faith.
Dante's Inferno, loosely based on Inferno (the first part of Dante Alighieri's Divine Comedy), portrays Dante as a Templar knight during the Crusade rather than a poet.
Templars feature in Deus Ex (2000) and Deus Ex: Invisible War (2003).
The Dragon Age series features a mage and demon-hunting organisation called the Templar Order. They serve the Chantry, the Dragon Age counterpart of the Christian church.
In Final Fantasy Tactics, the Knights Templar are a Military order of the Church of Glabados.
Gabriel Knight 3: Blood of the Sacred, Blood of the Damned (1999) posits both an alternative history of Christ and the suggestion that a Templar treasure, buried in Languedoc, France, is Christ's remains.
Hellgate: London (2007) features a Templar class, and makes numerous references to connections between the Freemasons and Knights Templar.
The games Infinity Blade and Infinity Blade 2 features an enemy referred to as "Knight Templar."
Templars feature in Knights of the Temple: Infernal Crusade (2004) and Knights of the Temple II (2005).
In Lionheart: Legacy of the Crusader (2003), a fictionalised version of the Knights Templar appears as a playable faction and plays a major role.
In Medieval II: Total War (2006), most Catholic factions can train Templar units into their armies or hire them as mercenaries while on a crusade.
In Pokémon Black and White (2010), the Unova region's Knights Templar-themed organization known as Team Plasma.
 Rise of the Tomb Raider features the Order of Trinity, a faction of Templars and later their descendants, tasked with finding the divine source at any cost. The Trinity is portrayed as being zealous and violent, using any means necessary to fulfill their task.
In StarCraft, the Protoss faction comprises two units labeled as Templars: the High Templar is a caster unit, while the Dark Templar is a stealthy assassin unit.
Stronghold: Crusader is set in the Middle East during the crusades.
In The First Templar (2011), the plot revolves around templars and the Holy Grail.
In The Secret World (2012), Templars comprise one of the three playable factions.
Time Gate: Knight's Chase (1996)
The Black Templars Chapter of the Space Marines from the Warhammer 40,000 tabletop wargame are based directly on the historical Knights Templar.

Literature and comics
(Alphabetical by author's surname)
Michael Baigent, Richard Leigh, and Henry Lincoln's book, The Holy Blood and the Holy Grail (1982; published as Holy Blood, Holy Grail in the United States), argues that the Holy Grail is both Mary Magdalene’s womb and the bloodline she started.  The authors contend that the Church tried to end this bloodline and its guardians, the Cathars and the Templars, in order to sustain the authority of their popes.
Derek Benz and J.S. Lewis' The Revenge of the Shadow King (2006) relates an alternate history of the Knights Templar, aligning them with an age-old order whose primary role is to defend the world from the powers of darkness. In this book, the Templars still exist and operate today from the shadows of an underground organization.
The storyline of Steve Berry's novel, The Templar Legacy (2006), revolves around the possibility that the Templar Treasure is close to being discovered, and that it may fall into the wrong hands. In this book, the treasure is closely connected to the question of Christ as the Savior, and Christ's Resurrection. The book also brings into question the contents and significance of the treasure.
Dan Brown's bestselling novel, The Da Vinci Code (2003), later adapted as an eponymous 2006 film, features Knights Templar.
Edward Burman's novel The Image of Our Lord (1991) centers around the conflict between Philip the Fair and the Templars.  
Elizabeth Chadwick's novel,Templar Silks (2018), focuses on a servant of the elderly William Marshal attempting to retrieve the titular silks from the Holy Land, so Marshall can fulfill a vow to the Templars. 
Paul C. Doherty's historical mystery novel, Satan's Fire (1996), features the Knights Templar as part of its plot. 
Maurice Druon's Les Rois maudits or The Accursed Kings (1973 et seq) depicts the death of the last Grand Master of the Order, and plays with the legend of the curse he laid on the pope, Philip the Fair, and Guillaume de Nogaret.
Umberto Eco's novel, Foucault's Pendulum (1988), features the mythos of the Knights Templar as keepers and defenders of the Holy Grail.
In the Swedish author Jan Guillou's  trilogy about Arn Magnusson (1998 et seq.), a fictional Swedish character from the Middle Ages, who was forced to become a Knight Templar, went to Jerusalem and after returning to Sweden, was a leading military figure shortly before the time of Birger Jarl.
Robert E. Howard's historical short story The Sowers of the Thunder (1932),  features the Knights Templar fighting in the Battle of La Forbie.
M. R. James' 1904 story 'Oh, Whistle, and I'll Come to You, My Lad' features its hero, Parkins, finding a strange whistle in the ruins of a Templar preceptory.
Catherine Jinks' children's novel Pagan's Crusade (1992) has its titular hero adopted by a Knight who is a member of the Templar Order.
Robert Jordan's fantasy series, The Wheel of Time, contains the fictional Children of the Light: a militant religious order who consider themselves above the laws of nations and are recognizable by the "snowy" white cloaks from which the nickname Whitecloak is derived. Their primary military units are heavy cavalry, possibly supplemented by the more "regular" army of the nation Amadicia, the seat of their power.
Takaya Kagami's manga Seraph of the End, illustrated by Yamato Yamamoto, with storyboards by Daisuke Furuya, features Crowley Eusford, an antagonist, who is revealed to be a Templar before he became an eight hundred year old vampire.
 Raymond Khoury's novel, The Last Templar (2005), is a Da Vinci Code-style thriller.
Pierre Klossowski's experimental novel The Baphomet (1965) features the ghosts of the Templars appearing each year to commemorate their order's destruction.
Zofia Kossak-Szczucka's historical novel Król trędowaty (1937, translated in English as The Leper King) features villainous Templars who secretly follow a pre-Christian religion.
Katherine Kurtz has written many books with Templar characters and themes, and edited three anthologies about the Templars: Tales of the Knights Templar (1995), On Crusade: More Tales of the Knights Templar (1998) and Crusade of Fire (2002).
James D. MacDonald's thriller The Apocalypse Door (2002) is an Alternate history novel where the Knights Templar survived into the twenty-first century.
Jordan Mechner, LeUyen Pham and Alexander Puvilland created the graphic novel, Templar in 2013. This is about the adventures of a Templar knight, Martin of Troyes, in the aftermath of the order's dissolution.
Herman Melville's short story, "The Paradise of Bachelors and the Tartarus of Maids" (1855)  treats the Templars with great irony.
 In Dave Morris' novella (based on the ITV show), Knightmare: The Sorcerer's Isle (1991), the hero, Treguard of Dunshelm, is pursued by a group of Knights Templar when he quests for the Holy Grail in Arabia.  
Artist Humberto Ramos and writer Brian Augustyn's fantasy-horror comic book series, Crimson (Wildstorm) (from story concepts by F.G. Haghenbeck and Oscar Pinto), features the Templars as an organization dedicated to fight monsters after they were disbanded by the Catholic Church and hold some level of authority over similar orders. They are supporting villains as they also antagonize the main protagonist, who is a vampire.
Ishmael Reed's postmodernist satirical novel, Mumbo-Jumbo (1972), has a Templar Knight Hinkle Von Vampton, who serves as the main villain.
James Rollins' novel, Bloodline: Sigma Force #8 (2012), opens in "Galilee, 1025", when "A cunning Templar knight uncovers a holy treasure: the Bachal Isu — the staff of Jesus Christ — a priceless icon that holds a mysterious and terrifying power that will forever change humanity if unleashed."
In Don Rosa's comics The Crown of the Crusader Kings and The Old Castle's Other Secret or A Letter from Home, Scrooge McDuck goes on expeditions looking for the treasures of the Knights Templar.
Kevin Sands' The Assassin's Curse (2017), the third book in The Blackthorn Key series, is a fictional tale set in 1665 France, where the protagonists must stop an assassination against the royalty of England and France. Along the way, they find that the assassinators are trying to find the Templar treasure. The protagonists must then find the treasure before anyone else.
Sir Walter Scott's novel Ivanhoe (1820) has as its villain Sir Brian de Bois-Gilbert, a Templar Knight.
Michael Spradlin's Youngest Templar (2009-2011) series is about the adventures of Tristan, a young boy who joins the Templar order.
William Watson's novel, Beltran in Exile (1979), is about a Knight Templar travelling to Scotland after the Crusades.

Music
HammerFall, a Swedish power metal band, refer to themselves as "The Templars of Heavy Metal", making frequent reference to the Templars on many of their albums.
Knights of the Cross is a concept album about the Templars by German metal band Grave Digger.
The Templars (band), a New York City Oi! band, is inspired by the Knights Templar. Similarly, their record label, Templecombe Records, is named after a Knights Templar site in Somerset, England.

Television
(Chronological)

The 1983 BBC drama The Dark Side of the Sun featured a secret society descended from the Knights Templar, who are active in the modern world.
In the Robin of Sherwood episode "Seven Poor Knights From Acre" (1984), the Knights Templar appear as antagonists who try to kill Robin and his fellow outlaws, whom the knights falsely believe have stolen a sacred Templar relic.
Carnivàle (2003–2005) had its 1930s characters encounter magical rings bearing symbols of the Templar order.
The Last Templar (2009) is a miniseries adaptation of Raymond Khoury's novel about a New York archaeologist researching the lost secrets of the medieval Knights Templar.
In the FX series, The Bastard Executioner (2015), The Dark Mute is a Templar Knight and a member of the Order of Seraphim. The Order of Seraphim are charged with preserving and protecting Jesus Christ's nine-volume, handwritten Libro Nazareni (New Testament) from the Church, which, as Annora and Ventrishire's manor priest, Father Ruskin, discuss in episodes 7 ("Behold the Lamb / Gweled yr Oen") and 8 ("Broken Things / Pethau Toredig"), and Father Ruskin and Robinus, the Archdeacon of Windsor discuss in episode 9 ("The Bernadette Maneuver / Cynllwyn Bernadette"), could be toppled by the book's release to the public. For that reason, the Church's leaders, such as Robinus, the Archdeacon of Windsor, and their  Knights of the Rosebud/Rosula, have targeted both the book and its protectors to be hunted and destroyed. To thwart the Rosula, The Dark Mute set "Templar traps" before abandoning his and Annora's cave.
They appear in Knightfall (December 6, 2017), a medieval drama miniseries that premiered on History Channel.

Audio drama
The 2016 audio drama Robin of Sherwood: The Knights Of The Apocalypse has Robin and his companions come into conflict with the titular Knights. The Knights of the Apocalypse are described as a splinter group from the Knights Templar. The Knights of the Apocalypse are also depicted in the play as having abandoned Christianity and instead worshiping the demon Baphomet.

See also 
Temple Society

References

 
Cultural depictions of knights
Christianity in popular culture